The Madhouse is a 2021 novel by Nigerian writer T. J. Benson. The Madhouse centers around the life of middle belters in Nigeria.

References

2021 Nigerian novels
Middle Belt, Nigeria